Incamyia is a genus of parasitic flies in the family Tachinidae.

Species
Incamyia charlini Cortés, 1968
Incamyia chilensis Aldrich, 1928
Incamyia cincerea Cortés & Campos, 1971
Incamyia cuzcensis Townsend, 1912
Incamyia nuda Aldrich, 1934
Incamyia perezi Cortés & Campos, 1971
Incamyia peruviana (Townsend, 1927)
Incamyia picta Cortés, 1976
Incamyia sandovali Cortés & Campos, 1971
Incamyia spinicosta Aldrich, 1928
Incamyia striata Aldrich, 1928
Incamyia unica (Townsend, 1915)

References

Exoristinae
Diptera of South America
Tachinidae genera
Taxa named by Charles Henry Tyler Townsend